Stocco dos Santos syndrome is an extremely rare multi-systemic genetic disorder which is present from birth. It is characterized by heart, skeletal, muscular abnormalities with accompanying intellectual disabilities.

Presentation 

People with Stocco dos Santos syndrome often show the following symptoms: dolichocephaly, cranial asymmetry, talipes equinovarus, camptodactyly, muscular hypoplasia, anophthalmia, buffalmos, progressive retinal detachment, aniridia, tricuspid valve prolapse, mitral and tricuspid insufficiency, hyperactivity, intellectual disability, low birth weight and short stature.

Causes 

This condition is thought to be caused by mutations in chromosome Xp11.22, and thought to be X-linked recessive.

Etiology 

On May 1, 1991, a novel X-linked genetic disorder was discovered through a Brazilian family, when severe intellectual disabilities, bilateral congenital hip dislocation, and low height were found in four male first-cousins, with three out of the four cousins carrying a new variant of glucose-6-phosphate dehydrogenase. There haven't been any more reported cases since 1992

References 

Genetic diseases and disorders
Syndromes with intellectual disability